Kushaiguda is a neighbourhood in Kapra Circle Greater Hyderabad, Telangana, India.
This area is near to ECIL Bus Terminal, NFC, ECIL,HCL, Companies. The Kushaiguda Market is one of the biggest market in the Medchal District. Kushaiguda is also industrial fully developed.

Transport
Kushaiguda TSRTC bus depot is located near Kamala Nagar. Kushaiguda is well-connected by the buses, TSRTC, which ply on two routes covering most of the area.

References

Neighbourhoods in Hyderabad, India